Fame Kills: Starring Kanye West and Lady Gaga was a planned co-headlining concert tour by American record producer and vocalist Kanye West, and singer Lady Gaga. For the tour, which would have supported West's fourth album 808s & Heartbreak (2008) and Gaga's The Fame Monster EP (2009), the pair conceived a production that would unite their different musical audiences. The tour was scheduled to run from November 2009 to January 2010, but was canceled after public controversy regarding West's interruption of Taylor Swift's Best Female Video speech at the 2009 MTV Video Music Awards. Shortly after the cancellation, Gaga embarked on her own tour, The Monster Ball Tour, while West went on to make his album My Beautiful Dark Twisted Fantasy, released on November 22, 2010.

Background and development 

In June 2009, Kanye West announced on The View he would be touring with Lady Gaga, but she would not perform as an opening act. "She's talented and so incredible that she's not an opening act", he said. "We're doing it together, with no opening act." In August, Gaga expressed her belief that the tour would be "one of the most groundbreaking moments in touring history." Before the singer agreed to collaborate with West, she demanded that the tour would remain accessible to her gay fans. "I'm gay", she recalled telling West in an interview with Out magazine, "my music is gay. My show is gay. And I love that it's gay. And I love my gay fans and they're all going to be coming to our show. And it's going to remain gay."

The tour's stage was designed by Gaga and West as a traverse; "Instead of being on just one end of the arena, the stage traverses the entire arena", Gaga noted. "It's not really in-the-round; it's more of a runway." The concept of the tour was to feature the performers on opposite ends of the stage, with Gaga's end representing "home and humble beginnings" and West's end representing "the fame", with the two fighting for each other's positions throughout the show. West would perform his singles, Gaga would perform hers, and then the duo would perform several duets.

Gaga said she enjoyed designing Fame Kills with West, calling themselves "creative kindreds." She explained that they did not plan to tour for themselves, but rather for "everybody else"; the goal of the tour would have been to bring two different groups of fans and music enthusiasts together. "I make pop music and Kanye's fans love pop music because he has changed what hip-hop means", she said. "For me, the tour is more about just bringing people together and having a big dance party. The show is a celebration of creativity, art, fashion and choreography." She also noted that West showed her a lot during the creative planning of the show, such as one instance where Gaga wanted to put side panels on the stage that would have obstructed the view for some fans. "He was like, 'I'm not selling a ticket to a fan who can't see the show,' and he's right", she said.

A promotional video for the tour was released in September 2009. West posted the video on his blog accompanied by the text, "What happened to all the rock stars? The fame killed them!" The 30-second clip features slow-motion footage of a topless Gaga being carried by a man presumed to be West. Daniel Kreps from Rolling Stone described it as "soft 70s porn", while adding that he had "no idea what [the text in the video] has to do with the 30-second clip, but we're sure it'll start to make more sense as more promos roll out as we approach the tour's launch." At Gaga's Fame Ball tour, she sang a short piano version of West's "Heartless".

Cancellation 

Following singer Taylor Swift's win for the music video "You Belong with Me" at the 2009 MTV Video Music Awards for Best Female Video, West stormed the stage, grabbed Swift's microphone, and declared that singer Beyoncé deserved the award for her "Single Ladies (Put a Ring on It)" video. He declared, "Yo, Taylor, I'm really happy for you, and I'm going to let you finish, but Beyoncé had one of the best videos of all time." West was profusely criticized by celebrities and fans alike over the incident. Following the interruption, the status of Fame Kills was rumored to be in question. A representative from a US urban radio station commented: "I think this could potentially affect his upcoming tour with Lady Gaga. This isn't an urban tour — urban audiences can be a bit more forgiving than mainstream audiences are. I can see him going on stage and people booing him. It's unfortunate." Less than a week after the ticket sales began, the tour was canceled but no reason was given.

Various rumors circulated as to why the tour was canceled. It was suspected that it was canceled due to poor ticket sales, feuding between Gaga and West's management teams, and Gaga's desire to play in smaller venues. Gaga's choreographer, Laurieann Gibson, said the tour was terminated due to "creative differences" between the singers. Gaga claimed that the cancellation was a mutual decision, and added that she would soon embark on her own headlining tour The Monster Ball Tour in the coming weeks, while West would be taking a break from his career. In 2016, West claimed that Gaga had been solely responsible for canceling the tour following the MTV incident.

Gaga was scheduled to begin The Monster Ball Tour in March 2010, but following the cancellation of Fame Kills, The Monster Ball Tour began in November 2009. Gaga said that while she was inspired by what she and West had planned to do with the Fame Kills tour, she decided not to use any of the ideas and concepts they created together, citing integrity.

Scheduled tour dates 
All tour dates were canceled.

References 

2009 in American music
2010 in American music
Cancelled concert tours
Co-headlining concert tours
Kanye West concert tours
Lady Gaga concert tours